Kondoa District is one of the seven districts of the Dodoma Region of Tanzania. It is bordered to the north by Manyara Region, and to the south by Chemba District. Its district capital is the town of Kondoa.

According to the 2012 Tanzania National Census, the population of Kondoa District was 269,704. , the population of the Kondoa District was 429,824. The population of the district declined from 2002 to 2012, because Chemba District was split off.

The Kondoa Irangi Rock Paintings, which were inscribed as a UNESCO World Heritage Site in 2006, are found in this district.

Transport
Trunk road T5 from Dodoma to Babati passes through the district.

Administrative subdivisions
As of 2012, Kondoa District was administratively divided into 28 wards.

Wards

 Bereko
 Bolisa
 Bumbuta
 Busi
 Changaa
 Chemchem
 Haubi
 Hondo mairo
 Itaswi
 Itololo
 Kalamba
 Kikilo
 Kikore
 Kilimani
 Kingale
 Kinyasi
 Kisese
 Kolo
 Kondoa mjini
 Kwadelo
 Masange
 Mnenia
 Pahi
 Salanka
 Serya
 Soera
 Suruke
 Thawi

References

 
Districts of Dodoma Region